The ‘’’New West End Synagogue’’’, located in St. Petersburgh Place, Bayswater, London, is one of the oldest synagogues in the United Kingdom still in use. It is one of two synagogues which have been awarded Grade I listed building status by Historic England, which has described it as “the architectural high-water mark of Anglo-Jewish architecture”. It can accommodate approximately 800 people.

History
Designed by George Audsley of Scotland in collaboration with Nathan S. Joseph, its foundation stone was laid on 7 June 1877 by Leopold de Rothschild in the presence of the Chief Rabbi, Dr. Nathan Marcus Adler, and the building was formally opened on 30 March 1879.

Chaim Weizmann, the first president of the State of Israel, and Herbert Samuel, the British High Commissioner for Palestine during the British Mandate, were both members of the synagogue. Their seats are marked with plaques. The synagogue’s first rabbi was Simeon Singer, who translated and edited the ‘’Authorised Daily Prayer Book‘’, which is still used in Orthodox synagogues across Great Britain.

Perhaps the best known rabbi of New West End Synagogue was Louis Jacobs, whose ties with the synagogue were severed in what became known as the Jacobs affair, and who went on to found the Masorti movement.

In August 2007, the New West End Synagogue was declared a national monument.

Community
The New West End Synagogue is a constituent of the United Synagogue (Orthodox) and serves the Jewish communities of Bayswater, Notting Hill, Kensington, Hammersmith and West London. Opened in 1879, it has in recent years enjoyed a major communal renaissance under the leadership of Rabbi Geoffrey Shisler. Rabbi Dr. Moshe Freedman was appointed senior minister for the community in 2015 and Services have been led by Cantor Yohel Heller since 2018.

As well as regular services, the synagogue provides regular children’s services for the under 5s and over 5s; Hebrew classes for children up to Bar or Bat Mitzvah age; a Mothers & Toddlers Group, regular adult education seminars and lectures; a keep fit group for ladies. There is a social committee; a Guild, which organises a range of lectures, outings and charitable activities; an Israel Group which arranges lectures and briefings on the Middle East by experts from all sides of the political spectrum; a Cares Group, which ensures that elderly and infirm members receive regular contact; and a Friendship Club, which meets monthly for more senior members.

Music
The New West End has a long heritage of choral music. The first choirmaster was David M. Davis, the compiler of ‘’The Voice of Prayer and Praise’’, known as the ‘’Blue Book’’, and the standard work on Anglo-Jewish minhag (customs). Davis spend 50 years as choirmaster, from 1879.
Mosaic Voices, the choir at New West End was founded and is conducted by Michael Etherton, who studied cello at Trinity College of Music and conducting at the Jerusalem Academy of Music and Dance. He is also Chief Executive of UK Jewish Film. Most of the Mosaic Voices choristers are either professional singers or musicians. The choir’s repertoire spans 400 years from works by Salmone di Rossi to new works commissioned by current or recent choristers such as Benjamin Till and Toby Young. Mosaic Voices is currently recording a CD called ‘The Blue Book’ for release in early 2019.

Architecture

The building was designed by George Ashdown Audsley and William James Audsley of Liverpool.  Their output was primarily Protestant churches, but this project and that for the Old Hebrew Congregation, Prince’s Road, Liverpool were two exceptions.  Other activities included the publication of books on ornament and Japanese art.  Both brothers eventually moved to the New York City area.  George became a designer of pipe organs and published notable works on this.

The Audsleys were particularly fond of historical ornament from various sources.  Their churches were High Victorian Gothic Revival, but their secular buildings and synagogues could feature elements of Egyptian, Greek, Saracenic, and Hindu architecture.

Particularly notable is the splendid Torah ark. Designed by Joseph, it closely resembles the ark he designed for Glasgow’s Garnethill Synagogue; both arks are raised on platforms, approached by a series of circular marble steps, and project into the room in the form of a multi-domed and arched building.

See also

Oldest synagogues in the United Kingdom

References

External links
Official website
English Heritage: New West End Synagogue, Bayswater
New West End Synagogue on Jewish Communities and Records – UK (hosted by ‘’jewishgen.org’’).

Grade I listed buildings in the City of Westminster
Grade I listed religious buildings and structures
Synagogues in London
Religion in the City of Westminster
Moorish Revival synagogues
Bayswater
Nathan Solomon Joseph buildings
Synagogues completed in 1879